Aspathines (born and died sometime between 550 BC and 450BC) was a senior official under Darius the Great and Xerxes I of Persia.

Aspathines is illustrated on the tomb of Darius I at Naqsh-e Rostam, with a dedication:

 

The only other courtier to be named with a dedication was Gobryas.

Aspathines had a son names Prexaspes, who became an Admiral in the navy of Xerxes during the Second Persian invasion of Greece.

References

5th-century BC Iranian people
6th-century BC Iranian people
Officials of Darius the Great